Ambana is a village in Bhatar CD block in Bardhaman Sadar North subdivision of Purba Bardhaman district in the state of West Bengal, India.

History
Census 2011 Ambana Village Location Code or Village Code 319776. The village of Ambana is located in the Bhatar tehsil of Burdwan district in West Bengal, India.

Demographics
The total geographic area of village is  653.97 hectares. Ambana features a total population of 1,782 peoples. There are about 217 houses in Ambana village.

Population and house data

Transport 

Healthcare
Nearest Rural Hospital at Bhatar (with 60 beds) is the main medical facility in Bhatar CD block. There are primary health centres

External links
 Map
 Ratanpur

References 

Villages in Purba Bardhaman district